The Dr. Enoch T. and Amy Zewicki House, also known as the Osage County Historical Society Museum, is a historic home located at Linn, Osage County, Missouri.  It was built about 1895, as a typical vernacular Queen Anne frame residence, and it was "updated" with an American Craftsman style front porch in the late 1930s.  Also on the property are the contributing frame washhouse and pump and a large frame woodshed.

It was listed on the National Register of Historic Places in 2002.

References

External links
Osage County Historical Society website

Historic house museums in Missouri
Houses on the National Register of Historic Places in Missouri
Queen Anne architecture in Missouri
Houses completed in 1895
Buildings and structures in Osage County, Missouri
National Register of Historic Places in Osage County, Missouri